The Oakley Junior/Senior High School is a public secondary school located on Main Street in Oakley, Idaho. It is part of the Cassia County Joint District.

History 
The original Oakley Junior/Senior High School was built in the early 1900s. In 1995, residents advocated for a new building, rather than using $1.5 million of the Cassia County bond issue proposal to upgrade the old building with a "planned auditorium, eight new classrooms and new heating system in the existing building".

The current school building was constructed in 1997.

Description 
Enrollment at Oakley in 2021-2022 was 205 students in grades 7 through 12, allowing for a personal one-on-one education experience for the students with the teachers. Oakley is a Title I school, with 20% of students qualifying for free or reduced price lunch under the National School Lunch Act of 1946.

The school's mascot is the hornet. The colors are red, black, and white.

Curriculum 
In 1995, Oakley pioneered a trimester system, to give students three grading periods, allowing them to pick up to an extra credit per year. Students attend five 70-minute classes daily, fulfilling state time requirements in each class. In the third trimester students have more elective choices.

Dual credit college courses and Idaho Digital Learning Alliance courses are offered, as well as honors courses in English and history.

Assessments 
Oakley Junior/Senior High School is known in its school district and in the state for high standardized test scores. In 2004, Oakley received a distinguished school award, the Additional Yearly Growth award, one of 15 schools in the state "that increased their percent of proficient or advanced students by at least 10 percent in either reading or math. The top 5 percent of schools that have significantly reduced a score gap between student groups receive the distinguished schools designation." In 2006, Oakley ranked in the top 10 percent of state high schools, based in part of students' reading scores on the Idaho Standards Achievement Test.

References

External links
Oakley High School
Idaho Schools: Oakley High School

Public high schools in Idaho
Schools in Cassia County, Idaho
Public middle schools in Idaho
1900 establishments in Idaho